Franklin County High School may refer to:

Franklin County High School (Florida), Eastpoint, Florida
Franklin County High School (Georgia), Carnesville, Georgia
Franklin County High School (Idaho), Preston, Idaho - Preston School District
Franklin County High School (Indiana), Brookville, Indiana
Franklin County High School (Kentucky), Frankfort, Kentucky
Franklin County High School (Mississippi), Meadville, Mississippi
Franklin County High School (Tennessee), Winchester, Tennessee
Franklin County High School (Rocky Mount, Virginia), Rocky Mount, Virginia

See also
Franklin High School (disambiguation)